Claudia Lizbeth Reséndiz López (born ) is a Mexican female volleyball player. She is a member of the Mexico women's national volleyball team and played for Jalisco in 2014. 

She was part of the Mexico national team at the 2014 FIVB Volleyball Women's World Championship in Italy.

Clubs
 Jalisco (2014)

References

1994 births
Living people
Mexican women's volleyball players
Place of birth missing (living people)